Muhammad Izzuddin Muhamat Hussin (born 19 November 1992) is a Malaysian footballer who currently plays as a goalkeeper for Malaysian club T–Team.

Career statistics

Club

References

External links
 

1992 births
Living people
Malaysian people of Malay descent
Malaysian footballers
Malaysia international footballers
Malaysia Super League players
Association football goalkeepers
Terengganu F.C. II players